Martin Ove Roseth (born 10 July 1998) is a Norwegian footballer who plays as a defender for 1. divisjon club Sogndal .

He hails from Volda and appeared for Volda TI's senior team in 2013 and 2014 before joining Molde youth setup. He made his Molde first-team debut in a March 2015 cup game against Brattvåg, and his league debut in August 2016 against Bodø/Glimt.

Career statistics

Club

References

1998 births
Living people
People from Volda
Association football defenders
Norwegian footballers
Molde FK players
Sogndal Fotball players
Eliteserien players
Norway youth international footballers
Levanger FK players
Norwegian First Division players
Norwegian Second Division players
Norwegian Third Division players
Norwegian Fourth Division players
Sportspeople from Møre og Romsdal